Saint Sinner is a superhero horror comic book series published by Marvel Comics' Razorline imprint that ran from 1993 to 1994. Created by filmmaker and horror/fantasy novelist Clive Barker as one of the imprint's four interconnected series, it starred Philip Fetter, a man possessed by both a demon and an angel.

Aside from the title, it is unrelated to the Barker-produced telefilm Saint Sinner.

Publication history
Created by filmmaker and horror/fantasy novelist Clive Barker, Saint Sinner was published for seven issues (cover-dated Oct. 1993 - April 1994). Written by Elaine Lee, it was drawn by Max Douglas for the first four issues. Richard Pace penciled issue #5, with inks by Douglas. Larry Brown drew the final two issues.

Lee also wrote a Saint Sinner prose short story in the final release of the Razorline imprint, Ectokid Unleashed (Oct. 1994), a 48-page one-shot starring the title character of another Razorline comic.

Clive Barker called Saint Sinner "just a wild one, the series which hopefully will press the limits of what comics can do".

Fictional character biography
Saint Sinner centered on Philip Fetter, a man possessed by both a demon and an angel. With the ability to evolve or regress anyone from superhuman to primal beast, Fetter travels the world changing lives.

References

External links
 Saint Sinner at the Unofficial Handbook of Marvel Comics Creators. Archived from the original on October 23, 2015.
 
 Saint Sinner at CliveBarker.com (unofficial site). Archived from the original on October 23, 2015.
 Saint Sinner at An International Catalogue of Superheroes. Archived from the original on October 23, 2015.

1993 comics debuts
Marvel Comics titles
Marvel Comics superheroes
Superhero horror comics